IBC Express Balita is the bi-hourly news bulletin program of IBC 13 in the Philippines. Previously an afternoon newscast, the program was originally anchored by Anne Marie Soriano and Alice Noel and aired from July 13, 1998 to August 5, 2011, replacing Headline Trese and was replaced by News Team 13. The News Bulletin aired from October 25, 2020 to present, replacing the second incarnation of IBC Headliners.

Its reportorial teams are tasked to gather news from every major beat in the Greater Manila Area as well as nearby provinces. Currently, Express Balita is one of two IBC-produced news programs (along with Tutok 13).

Airing history

As an afternoon newscast
The newscast premiered on July 13, 1998, replacing Headline Trese. It was first anchored by Anne Marie Soriano and Alice Noel. A few months later, Noel left the newscast, leaving Soriano with rotating anchors as her co-anchor. In 1999, Ida Marie Bernasconi joined the newscast, the newscast had several changes to the opening billboard. On February 21, 2000, returning media personality Snooky Serna joined Soriano as its new anchor, with a brand new opening billboard, graphics, soundtrack and stand-up news delivery.

On January 8, 2001, both Soriano and Serna were replaced by former teen star Precious Hipolito-Castelo and Malacañang correspondent Ron Gagalac as its new anchors maintaining the same title card, soundtrack, and graphics. On January 7, 2002, Noli Eala became Castelo's new co-anchor replacing Gagalac, which he transferred to ABS-CBN as a news reporter years later. By that time, the newscast expanded its broadcasting time to 60 minutes on Mondays, Tuesdays and Thursdays (as Wednesdays and Fridays paved way for the PBA on IBC coverage) and had several changes later on.

Several months later in the same year, Eala was replaced by Adrian Ayalin as the former was appointed to anchor IBC News Tonight. In 2004, after IBC relaunched its slogan and station ID ("Ang Bagong Pilipino") in December 2003, the newscast also done changes to its studios, opening billboard and graphics; and it also reused its first soundtrack theme of the newscast (which used from the latter's debut in 1998 to 2000) for follow-details before and after news reports. A year later, Ali Atienza replaced Ayalin, which he transferred to ABS-CBN as a news reporter. However, Atienza left the newscast in 2007 in order to run for mayor of Manila. He was temporarily replaced by Errol Dacame. In 2008, DZRH radio anchor Bing Formento became Castelo's new co-anchor replacing Atienza. The team-up continued until 2009 when Castelo decided to run for Councilor of Quezon City.

On November 9, 2009, Jake Morales replaced Hipolito-Castelo and Formento as its new anchor; the newscast relaunched to their graphics, soundtrack and opening billboard. For several weeks, Morales was joined by Toni Marcelo, and then, later on, Karen Padilla finally took the anchor's chair replacing the former. However, Padilla, being the wife of Erwin Tulfo, left the newscast in early 2011 to be acquired by TV5 to anchor for Aksyon Breaking on AksyonTV, leaving Morales as the sole anchor of the program, he was joined by Cathy Eigenmann as his new co-anchor on May 16, 2011.

On June 20, 2011, Chal Lontoc and Zyrene Parsad-Valencia took over the new and final anchors. The newscast ceased airing on August 5, 2011, to make way for the afternoon edition of News Team 13.

As a news bulletin
On October 28, 2022, IBC 13 announced through its Facebook page that IBC Express Balita will be relaunched as short news updates program airing every two hours every afternoon from Monday to Friday. The program premiered on October 31 and replaced the second iteration of IBC Headliners that lasted for a month in 2021.

Anchors
Current anchor (as News bulletin)
Jenny de Juan
Zon Ballesteros
Divina Dela Torre
Mary Anne Tolentino
Kurt Mustaza
Patrick Lastra
Former main anchors (as Afternoon newscasts)
Anne Marie Soriano (1998–2001)
Alice Noel (1998–1999)
Ida Marie Bernasconi (1999–2000)
Snooky Serna (2000–2001)
Precious Hipolito-Castelo (2001–2009)
Ron Gagalac (2001–2002)
Noli Eala (2002)
Adrian Ayalin (2002–2003)
Ali Atienza (2004–2007)
Errol Dacame (2007–2008)
Bing Formento (2008–2009)
Jake Morales (2009–2011)
Toni Marcelo (2009)
Karen Padilla-Tulfo (2009–2011)
Cathy Eigenmann (2011)
Chal Lontoc (2011)
Zyrene Parsad-Valencia (2011)

Former substitute anchors (as Afternoon newscasts)
Karen Tayao-Cabrera (1998–2000)
Nitz de Onon-Rosales (1998–2000)
Ina Rubio (1998–2000)
Chele Mendoza (1998–2000)
Neil Santos III (1998–2000)
Maricel Halili (2001–2009)
Jeffrey Zaide (2001–2009) 
Jess Caduco (2008–2009)
Rida Reyes (2008)
Florida Padilla (2003–2007)
Toff Rada (2009–2010)
Alvin Sejera (2009–2011)
Kara Cruz (2011)

References

See also
List of programs broadcast by Intercontinental Broadcasting Corporation

Intercontinental Broadcasting Corporation news shows
IBC News and Public Affairs
Intercontinental Broadcasting Corporation original programming
1990s Philippine television series
2000s Philippine television series
2010s Philippine television series
2020s Philippine television series
1998 Philippine television series debuts
2011 Philippine television series endings
2022 Philippine television series debuts
Filipino-language television shows
Philippine television news shows
Flagship evening news shows